Sampo Haapamäki (born 3 February 1979) is a Finnish composer. He has won several international composition competitions.

Education
Haapamäki studied at the Sibelius Academy in Helsinki with Tapio Nevanlinna and Veli-Matti Puumala. He has also studied with Claus-Steffen Mahnkopf in Leipzig, Germany and with Tristan Murail at Columbia University.

Compositions
Haapamäki has embraced a quarter-tone based language during the last few years. Some of his most notable compositions written in this style are: "Velinikka" (2008), for quarter-tone accordion and 18 musicians; "Kirjo" (2006), for bass-clarinet and 26 musicians; "Design" (2005), for 16 musicians; "Fresh" (2004, 2007), for 15 musicians; "Maailmamaa" (2010) for mixed choir and tape.

Awards
2003 Finalist at the Queen Elisabeth Composition Competition
2004 Gaudeamus International Composers Award
2005 ISCM-CASH Young Composer Award
2006 Teosto Prize (in Finnish)]
2020 Nordic Council Music Prize for his Quarter-tone Piano Concerto

Works

Symphony orchestra
 Motto (2015)
 Historia (2022)

Chamber orchestra
 Signature (2003)
 Fresh (2004, 2007)
 Design (2005)

Soloist(s) and orchestra
 Kirjo (2006) concerto for bass clarinet
 Velinikka (2008) concerto for quarter-tone accordion
 Conception (2012) double concerto for quarter-tone guitar and quarter-tone accordion
 Quarter-Tone Piano Concerto (2017)

Ensemble
 Heritage (2016) for ensemble of Harry Partch instruments
 24/7 (2019) for quarter-tone flute, quarter-tone clarinet, quarter-tone guitar, quarter-tone piano, quarter-tone accordion, violin and violoncello

Ensemble/instrument with electronics
 Logo (2013) for violin and 9-channel electronics
 IDEA (2018) for 11 musicians and 8-channel electronics

Concert band
 Sight (2001)

Big band
 Style (2001)

Chamber music
 Sonata (2000) for clarinet, marimba, piano and accordion
 Avenue (2000) for alto saxophone and piano
 Wide (2001) for clarinet, piano, violin, viola, cello
 Highway (2002) for flute and piano
 Connection (2007) for 2 violins, viola and cello

Solo instrument
 Emfa (2000) for tuba
 Tri (2000) for trombone
 Power (2001) for accordion

Vocal music
 Haljennut (2004) for sopranist-baritone, violin, viola and cello
 Maailmamaa (2010) for mixed choir and tape

References

External links

Profile, Columbia University
Profile, Music Finland

1979 births
Finnish composers
Finnish male composers
Living people
Columbia University School of the Arts alumni
Gaudeamus Composition Competition prize-winners
Contemporary classical composers